Blue Ridge School is a private, all-male boarding school for students grades 9-12 located in the foothills of the Blue Ridge Mountains in Saint George, Virginia, near Charlottesville and the University of Virginia. The school was originally founded in 1909 by The Rev. George P. Mayo, an Episcopalian clergyman, as the Blue Ridge Industrial School, a school for the rural mountain students living in the region. It closed in 1960. The Blue Ridge School of today opened in 1962 as an all-boys boarding college preparatory school. Approximately 185 students attend Blue Ridge from 27 states and 15 foreign countries, with many from Virginia and other Southeastern and Mid-Atlantic states. The school's campus is 751 acres (3 km²) in Greene County, Virginia, adjoining Brokenback Mountain at the edge of Shenandoah National Park in the Appalachian Mountains. The headmaster is William "Trip" Darrin, since 2012.

History
After two years of information gathering and preparation, the Blue Ridge Industrial School was founded by Reverend George Pickett Mayo in 1909 as a coeducational vocational school, and opened in January 1910 with about 35 students; two students graduated at the first commencement in 1918. Enrollment rose to 112 in 1922 and 165 in 1928. The first building was Neve Hall; the school lost buildings to fires in 1911, 1918, and 1962, when the first infirmary was destroyed, and was hit by a tornado on September 30, 1959. Mayo served as Superintendent until 1944. Blue Ridge became a college preparatory school for boys in 1962, with a short-term reduction of the student body to 66.

The original 148 acre (0.6 km²) campus, located 20 miles (32 km) from Charlottesville, Virginia, sits at the foothills of the Blue Ridge Mountains. The campus has grown to nearly 750 acres (3.2 km²) and includes a lake and several ponds. The Robert A. Gibson Memorial Chapel, the Martha Bagby Battle House (former Headmaster’s Residence), and the old St. George Post Office still stand on the school's grounds.  The Gibson Memorial Chapel, designed by architect Ralph Adams Cram and built in 1929–1932, and the Martha Bagby Battle House were listed on the National Register of Historic Places in 1993.

Outdoors program
Blue Ridge School has an outdoors program that includes mountain biking, archery, fishing, and hiking among other activities. Students are also taught wilderness survival skills. It has 15 miles of mountain biking and hiking trails on campus.

Academic program
Blue Ridge School uses project-based learning principles developed by PBLWorks to create a learning environment well suited for boys. In 2018, the school introduced an entrepreneurship program that put students through the process of conceiving a product, developing a business plan, and pitching the product to a panel of judges. The following year, this program became a series of entrepreneurism classes.

The Fishburne Learning Center provides individualized learning skills development for approximately 25% of the students. Learning Center classes occur during the school day and each class has two to three students.

Faculty
Amber Wilkins was named Dean of Faculty in 2021. Former Blue Ridge School Dean of the Faculty Pete Bonds was a recipient of the 2019 International Boys' Schools Coalition Action Research Award for his work with 12th grade history students. Approximately 80% of faculty live on campus.

Athletics
Blue Ridge School offers many sports and participates in the fall, winter and spring seasons. As of April 2020, the school has 26 athletic teams. It participates in the Blue Ridge Athletic Conference (BRAC) and the Virginia Independent Schools Athletic Association (VISAA). Its football team won state championships in 1994, 2012, and 2016. Its basketball program won state championships in 2015, 2017, 2019, 2020, 2021, and 2022 and has produced many Division-1 NCAA players. In the 2016-17 sports year, both their football team and the basketball team won a VA state championship. It has a 22,000 square foot (2,000 m²) indoor field house its facilities include Massey Gymnasium, indoor tennis and basketball courts, an exercise and weight-lifting facility, wrestling-room, and batting cages. Blue Ridge's athletics teams include:

Fall

Winter

Spring

Beginning in the mid-1990s, Blue Ridge developed a well regarded basketball program, with players including LaRon Campbell-Hall, Barry Harper, Brandon Freeman, Luke Minor, Tom Timmermans from the Netherlands, and Andrey Savtchenko from Russia, and won a state title. Recent NCAA standouts from Blue Ridge School include Aamir Simms and Mamadi Diakite.

References

External links
Official website
The Association of Boarding Schools profile

Boarding schools in Virginia
Boys' schools in the United States
Episcopal schools in Virginia
Private high schools in Virginia
Schools in Greene County, Virginia
Preparatory schools in Virginia